Professional Dreamer is an album by American pianist David Benoit released in 1999, and recorded for the GRP label. The album reached #8 on Billboards Jazz chart.
The song "Dad's Room" (track #10) was a Grammy nominee for Best Instrumental Composition.

Track listing
All tracks composed by David Benoit and Rick Braun; except where indicated 
"Why Not" - 4:54
"Miles After Dark" - 5:31
"Something You Said" (David Benoit) - 4:57
"ReJoyce" - 4:44
"Golden Gate" (David Benoit) - 4:52
"Gothic Jazz Dance" (David Benoit) - 4:12
"Jump Start" - 4:46
"Thinking 'Bout the Cove" (David Benoit) - 4:18
"Twilight March" - 4:43
"Dad's Room" (David Benoit) - 3:41

 Personnel 
 David Benoit – acoustic piano (1-10), computer programming (1-10), Hammond B3 organ (1, 7), strings (3, 9), keyboards (5, 6, 8), Fender Rhodes (5, 6, 8, 9), sequenced percussion (5, 6, 8), arrangements and conductor (10)
 Rick Braun – programming (1-4, 7),  trumpet (2)
 Ross Bolton – guitar (1)
 Pat Kelly – guitar (2, 4, 9)
 Marc Antoine – guitar (3)
 Tony Maiden – guitar (4, 7)
 Cliff Hugo – bass (2, 4)
 Jimmy Johnson – bass (3, 9)
 Neil Stubenhaus – bass (5, 6, 8)
 David Palmer – drums (1, 4, 9)
 Vinnie Colaiuta – drums (5, 6, 8)
 John Ferraro – cymbal (3), percussion (3), drums (7)
 Spectrasonics Liquid Grooves – loops (3)
 Brad Dutz – percussion (5, 6, 8)
 Andy Suzuki – tenor saxophone (7)Strings on "Dad's Room" Suzie Katayama – music contractor 
 Bruce Dukov – concertmaster 
 Arni Eglisson, Dave Stone and Ken Wild – bass
 Larry Corbett and Steve Richards – cello 
 Jimbo Ross, John Scanlon and Evan Wilson – viola 
 Jackie Brand, Joel Derouin, Bruce Dukov, Endre Granat, Clayton Haslop, Karen Jones, Peter Kent, Ezra Kliger, Barbara Porter, Anatoly Rosinsky, Miwako Wantanabe and John Wittenberg – violin

 Production 
 Rick Braun – producer (1-4, 7, 9)
 David Benoit – producer (5, 6, 8, 10)
 Clark Germain – producer (5, 6, 8, 10), mixing (5, 6, 8, 10), recording engineer 
 Steve Sykes – mixing (1-4, 7, 9)
 Ken Gruberman – music preparation, computer consultant 
 Daniel Sofer – computer consultant
 John Newcott – release coordination
 Yvonne Wish – production coordinator 
 David Riegel – graphic design 
 Hollis King – art direction 
 Kamil Vojnar – illustration 
 Tracy Lamonica – photographyStudios'
 Recorded at 29th Street Studio (Torrance, CA).
 Tracks 1-4, 7 & 9 mixed at Lefty's
 Tracks 5, 6, 8 & 10 mixed at The Village Recorder (Los Angeles, CA).

Charts

References

External links
David Benoit-Professional Dreamer at Discogs

1999 albums
David Benoit (musician) albums
GRP Records albums